The Battle of Rapido River was fought from 20 to 22 January 1944 during one of the Allies' many attempts to breach the Winter Line in the Italian Campaign during World War II. Despite its name, the battle occurred on the Gari River.

Units of the U.S. 36th Infantry Division, commanded by Major General Fred Walker crossed the Gari river in boats and seized the west bank of the river. However, the Americans were cut off from reinforcements and subjected to heavy fire and counterattacks from elements of the German 15th Panzergrenadier Division. The 36th Infantry Division suffered very high losses, and after two days of fighting the survivors retreated back across the river.

Background
In late 1943, the Italian campaign had reached a turning point. The Allied advance through Italy bogged down around Monte Cassino, which was a crucial point in the Axis defensive position known as the Winter Line. As a result, Allied commanders planned to outflank the Germans with Operation Shingle, an amphibious landing at Anzio. To assist in the landing, Allied forces to the south were to launch attacks in the days leading up to Operation Shingle by seizing German positions across the Garigliano and Rapido rivers; it was hoped that German forces would be drawn away from Anzio to counter these attacks. However, the simultaneous attack at Anzio limited the availability of air support for the river crossings.

Lieutenant General Mark Clark, commanding general of the United States Fifth Army ordered a crossing of the Gari River, south of Monte Cassino, with two regiments (the 141st and 143rd Infantry) of the U.S. 36th Infantry Division, commanded by Major General Fred Walker. After a bridgehead was secured, an armored advance was to proceed across the Liri Valley.

Battle
On the night of 20 January 1944, the U.S. 36th Infantry Division, under command of Major General Geoffrey Keyes' II Corps, fired an artillery barrage of 31,000 rounds on German positions across the Gari river, resulting in negligible damage. Feint attacks were conducted by the 34th Infantry Division to the north, near Monte Cassino, to divert attention from the main advance. After the barrage, the 141st and 143rd Infantry Regiments were ordered to cross the river, which began at 19:00. Initial casualties were inflicted on the Allies by landmines on the east bank of the river, despite army engineers being tasked with clearing approaches to the river. German artillery fire responding to the barrage also landed hits on elements of the 141st regiment before they were able to reach the river. Two rifle companies of the 143rd successfully crossed the river, but German return fire resulted in the loss of too many men and landing boats, and their foothold was abandoned. The 141st fared even worse, being forced to withdraw with heavy casualties after landing directly on a minefield.

The next day, both regiments were ordered to perform another attack, beginning at 16:00. Although this assault met with more success, the American foothold was still unsustainable, as withering fire from the 15th Panzergrenadier Division prevented the construction of pontoon and Bailey bridges by engineers. Without the bridges, armor could not assist in the attack, and the infantry were left to fight on their own, resulting in devastating casualties for the two regiments. After more than twenty hours of fruitless combat, both were ordered to withdraw. The 143rd was able to withdraw relatively intact, but much of the 141st was left stranded due to their bridges and boats being destroyed by enemy fire. The German defenders mounted a counterattack against the trapped Americans, capturing hundreds of soldiers. Major General Walker decided against committing the division's last regiment, the 142nd Infantry, and the battle concluded at 21:40 on January 22.

Aftermath
No significant gains had been made in either assault, and the original objective of luring away German forces was entirely unsuccessful.

Significant controversy followed the American defeat, with Clark criticizing Walker's execution of the battle plan. Walker responded that the entire battle had been foolhardy and unnecessary, and that Clark's plan, which he (Walker) had protested against, was all but guaranteed to fail. The battle of the Rapido River was one of the largest defeats suffered by the U.S. Army during World War II and was the subject of an investigation in 1946 by Congress to establish responsibility for the disaster.

Secretary of War Robert P. Patterson prepared a report in response to the Congressional investigation, in which he concluded that "the action to which the Thirty-sixth Division was committed was a necessary one and that General Clark exercised sound judgment in planning it and in ordering it." Colonel Miller Ainsworth, president of the 36th Infantry Division Association, testified before Congress in opposition to Patterson's conclusions and criticized what he perceived as Mark Clark attempting to evade investigation of his conduct.

See also
 Battle of Monte Cassino
 Battle of Anzio
 Fred L. Walker
 Mark W. Clark

References
citations

Sources

External links
Winter Line Stories Original stories from the front lines of the Italian Campaign by US Army Liaison Officer Major Ralph R. Hotchkiss

Conflicts in 1944
1944 in Italy
Battles of World War II involving the United States
Military history of the United States during World War II
World War II operations and battles of the Italian Campaign
January 1944 events
Battle of Monte Cassino